Desplatsia is a genus of flowering plants belonging to the family Malvaceae.

Its native range is Western Tropical Africa to Uganda.

The genus name of Desplatsia is in honour of Mr Desplats, thought possibly to be Victor Desplats (1819–1888).

Known species:

Desplatsia chrysochlamys 
Desplatsia dewevrei 
Desplatsia mildbraedii 
Desplatsia subericarpa

References

Grewioideae
Malvaceae genera